Diaperia is a genus of flowering plants in the family Asteraceae, formerly considered part of Evax. Common names include "rabbit's tobacco" and "dwarf cudweed." These are annual herbs native to the northern Mexico and the central and southern United States, primarily the Great Plains.

 Species
 Diaperia candida, silver rabbit-tobacco - Texas Oklahoma Arkansas Louisiana 
 Diaperia prolifera, big-head rabbit-tobacco  - Texas Louisiana Arkansas Oklahoma New Mexico Colorado Kansas Wyoming Montana Nebraska South Dakota Missouri Mississippi Alabama South Carolina
 Diaperia verna, spring or many-stem rabbit-tobacco  - Tamaulipas, Coahuila, Arizona New Mexico Texas Oklahoma Louisiana Arkansas Alabama Georgia South Carolina

References

Asteraceae genera
Gnaphalieae
Flora of North America